Rick Bertrand (born December 22, 1969) was the Iowa State Senator from the 7th District. A Republican, he has served in the Iowa Senate between 2010 and 2019.

After graduating from Bishop Heelan High School, he attended Iowa Central Community College before obtaining a degree at the University of Northern Iowa in Political Science. He earned his Masters Degree in Organizational Leadership from Bellevue University in 2018.  Before being elected to the state senate, he unsuccessfully ran for the 2nd district seat of the Iowa House of Representatives in 2008.

In 2016, he ran in the primary for the Republican nomination for Iowa's 4th congressional district but lost the nomination to incumbent Steve King.

His current occupation is the owner of Bertrand Construction LLC located in Sioux City Iowa.

References

External links 

Iowa Central Community College alumni
University of Northern Iowa alumni
Republican Party Iowa state senators
1969 births
Living people
Politicians from Sioux City, Iowa
21st-century American politicians